John Tohill (1855–1914) was an Irish Roman Catholic Prelate and 26th Lord Bishop of Down and Connor.

He was born in Gortmacrane  County Londonderry, on 23 December 1855 to Anthony Tohill and Alice (née Convery) Tohill. He studied Classics at Tirgarvil School and then boarded at St. Malachy's College before entering Maynooth College on 21 September 1875.

Priestly ministry
Tohill was recognised as a brilliant student at Maynooth coming first in every class. Patrick Dorrian (then Bishop of Down and Connor) recognised Tohill's scholarly ability and even before he was ordained priest he was appointed to the staff of Diocesan College in Belfast. He was ordained by Patrick Dorrian on 22 September 1878.

Tohill taught classics (mostly Greek) at the College until 1894 but always involved himself in the wider pastoral life of Belfast. An Irish Times obituary recalled that during the 1886 Belfast riots "Fr Tohill exercised his influence in the interests of peace." He gave evidence, along with several Catholic laymen, at a Select Committee in Westminster on what he had witnessed and police behaviour in 1886.

In 1894 he transferred to Holy Family Parish in North Belfast and then from 1898 to 1905 he was Administrator of St Peter's Cathedral, Belfast.   He served as Parish Priest of Cushendall from 1905 to 1908.

Bishop
Following the death of Henry Henry he was consecrated 26th Lord Bishop of Down and Connor on 20 September 1908 by Cardinal Michael Logue.   One of his first tasks as bishop was to lay the foundation stone at Clonard Monastery which occurred on 4 October 1908.

In 1911 he visited his home district of Lavey, County Londonderry to administer the sacrament of confirmation to over 160 children, there having been no celebration of the sacrament in the preceding five years due to the illness of the Bishop of Derry.

He died after a year long illness in St. Malachy's College on 4 July 1914 and is buried in Milltown Cemetery, West Belfast. A London Times obituary claimed he had been appointed bishop because he had had no interest in politics and paid tribute to his "quiet, unassuming character."

He was succeeded by Joseph MacRory.

References

External links
 Profile catholic-hierarchy.org; accessed 5 February 2016.

1855 births
1914 deaths
Alumni of St Patrick's College, Maynooth
Roman Catholic bishops of Down and Connor
20th-century Roman Catholic bishops in Ireland
People educated at St Malachy's College
People from County Londonderry